The tournaments of Handball at the 2023 Pan American Games are scheduled to be held from October 21 to November 1, 2023. The venue for the competition is the Gimnasio Polideportivo located in Viña del Mar.

A total of eight men's and eight women's teams (each consisting up to 14 athletes) will compete in each tournament. This means a total of 224 athletes are scheduled to compete.

The winner of each competition will qualify for the 2024 Summer Olympics in Paris, France.

Qualification
Eight men's teams and eight women's teams will qualify to compete at the games in each tournament. The host nation (Chile) received automatic qualification in both tournaments, along with seven other teams.

Men

Women

Participating nations
The following countries qualified handball teams. The numbers of participants qualified are in parentheses.

Medal summary

Medalists

References

Handball at the 2023 Pan American Games
Handball
2023
Pan American Games